Ramakrishna Mission Vidyamandira is an autonomous degree college of India located in Belur, Howrah near Belur Math.

History

The Ramakrishna Mission Vidyamandira is a fully residential degree college for boys affiliated to the University of Calcutta founded in 1941 by the Ramakrishna Mission. The name 'Vidyamandira' was given by Swami Vivekananda in 1898 who had envisioned such an institution modeled on the ancient Indian 'Gurukula' system. Swami Vimuktanandaji and Swami Tejasanandaji were the founding Secretary and the founding principal, respectively, of this premier institute of higher learning.

At the very beginning, it started as an intermediate arts college. In the year between 1945 and 1946, the college got affiliation in commerce and science subjects. It was upgraded into a three-year degree college from July 1960. The higher secondary section was added in September 1978 and later on discontinued as per the West Bengal state government policy. In the year 1994, two new courses, B.Sc. (Major) in Computer Applications and Industrial Chemistry, commenced under the UGC scheme of vocationalization of degree education. B.Sc. (Major) in Computer Application was changed to B.Sc. Computer Science Honours course in  2009 academic session. Postgraduate courses in Bengali, Sanskrit, Mathematics and Applied Chemistry have been introduced recently. From 2013 July academic session postgraduate course in Philosophy was introduced.

In April 2010, the University Grants Commission (UGC) recognized Vidyamandira as a 'Centre of Potential for Excellence' (CPE); in June 2010 Vidyamandira was awarded with 'Autonomous' status in academic affairs, implying that Vidyamandira will be able to frame the syllabus, introduce new courses at the undergraduate and postgraduate levels, formulate teaching-learning-evaluation methods and offer degrees of its own. 

The college ranked 9th among colleges in India by the National Institutional Ranking Framework (NIRF) during 2022. It held the 5th position in the previous academic year and the 9th and 11th positions earlier. 

It was accredited 'A++' grade by the National Assessment and Accreditation Council (NAAC), India in 2022. In 2022 the college was re-accredited by the National Assessment and Accreditation Council with CGPA 3.58 out of 4 according to the present gradation policy.

Academics

At present, 14 undergraduate and 5 postgraduate courses are offered.
Vidyamandira offers B.A. and B.Sc. Honours Courses in 14 subjects and M.A. and M.Sc. courses in 5 subjects.
Departments offering science courses
 Mathematics (Honours, Postgraduate and Ph.D.)
 Physics (Honours)
 Chemistry (Honours)
 Microbiology (Honours)
 Applied Chemistry (Postgraduate and Ph.D.)
 Industrial Chemistry (Honours)
 Computer Science (Honours(BSc. CS), Postgraduate(MSc. CSMI))
 Electronics (General Course Only)
 Statistics (General Course Only)
 Zoology (Honours)
 Economics (Honours)

Departments offering humanities and social sciences courses
 Bengali (Honours, Postgraduate  and  P.hd)
 Sanskrit (Honours and Postgraduate)
 English (Honours)
 Philosophy (Honours, Postgraduate, M. Phil, Ph.D)
 Political Science (Honours)
 History (Honours)

Student life

There are around 600 students enrolled in this college. The students stay at five hostels at the sprawling campus: 'Shree', 'Vidya', 'Vinay', 'Vivek' and 'Shraddha'. These hostels are called "Bhavanas". They are expected to lead a disciplined life under the supervision of the monastic members of the Ramakrishna order while at the college.

See also 
List of colleges affiliated to the University of Calcutta
Education in India
Education in West Bengal

References

External links
 

Men's universities and colleges
Universities and colleges in Howrah district
Universities and colleges affiliated with the Ramakrishna Mission
University of Calcutta affiliates
Educational institutions established in 1941
1941 establishments in India